"Magic" is a song by British rock band Coldplay for their sixth studio album, Ghost Stories (2014). It was released on 3 March 2014 as the record's lead single, being written and produced by band members Guy Berryman, Jonny Buckland, Will Champion, Chris Martin, while production assistance was provided by Paul Epworth.

Background and recording
The song was recorded by the band during sessions for their sixth studio album in 2013, at their purpose-built studios The Bakery and The Beehive in North London, England, both originally constructed for work on their two previous studio albums, 2008's Viva la Vida or Death and All His Friends and 2011's Mylo Xyloto respectively. The song's bass riff, the first part of the song, was originally conceived by Guy Berryman during the band's recording sessions in February 2013.

The single art for "Magic" was etched by British-based, Czech etching artist Mila Fürstová. The artwork features a symbolic white dove imposed onto a blue background. Much like other artworks of the Ghost Stories album cycle, the image depicts a scenario contained within the perimeter of the subject of focus, this time the white dove. The scenario features imagery related to stage magic, including a levitating couple, a flying deck of cards and a theater stage.

Composition
A beat consisting of a "muffled snare" and "dusty bass riff" is repeated throughout most of the song. As the song progresses, a piano is later added to the instrumentation which is eventually swapped out for a stomp-clap beat and again for a synth beat. Following the song's second chorus, these beats are gradually combined while Martin sings in falsetto. The song's "anticlimactic" portion then decreases intensity until it has eventually resumed to simply a snare and bass riff.

Critical reception

Jamieson Cox of Time magazine wrote that "Magic" isn't as far from the style of Coldplay's previous albums as "Midnight", the first track from Ghost Stories that was revealed. He added that the single "does hint at a few new tricks up the band's sleeve," and described it as "a successful marriage of old and new." Rolling Stone magazine's Kory Grow commented in similar tone, calling the song "a return to form," proven "to be Coldplay through and through." Digital Spy's Lewis Corner concurred, writing: "[The song] isn't a quick card trick to draw you in like some of the band's previous hits, but rather a long-form spectacle that slowly allures you with its intricacies and delicate craftsmanship."

Writing for Consequence of Sound , Alex Young opined that the track "sounds a lot less Bon Iver and a lot more Chris Martin drinking a venti, no-whip Skinny Vanilla Latte on a Sunday afternoon." Carl Williot of Idolator noted the song's Edge influence and commented that it showed "a tonedown their trademark grandeur in exchange for a more minimalist, atmospheric set of songs." Spin'''s Kyle McGovern had similar thoughts, and called the track "a low-key meditation on love." Bill Lamb of About.com gave the song 4.5 stars out of 5 and called it a "refreshingly simple, heartwarming love song." Writing for Los Angeles Times, Mikael Wood commented: "With Martin's delicate falsetto floating over a muted drum-machine beat ... this one offers up a sumptuous vocal melody – and a surprisingly soulful one at that".Mondo Sonoro (#43), and Rolling Stone (#30) named "Magic" one of the best songs from 2014, while Tampa Bay Times (#45) included the track on their "Best Pop Songs of the 2010s" list. In 2022, Billboard placed the song at number 26 on their editorial of "Best Love Songs of the 21st Century".

Music video
Background and concept

A music video for "Magic" was directed by Jonas Åkerlund. Starring Chinese actress Zhang Ziyi, the video pays tribute to silent films, and is based on a literal interpretation of "Magic", with the narrative revolving around an "old-timey magic show". The five-minute music video was premiered on music video hosting service Vevo on 7 April 2014.

The narrative of the music video is centered around a magic show, which was translated by the director from a literal interpretation of Coldplay's song, whose lyrics make allusions to various magic tricks and stunts. The video itself is presented as a monochrome silent film, with cinematography and production mimicking those of the early 20th Century silent films, including an opening credits sequence, with "ragtime jazz", reminiscent of those used in early silent films. The video's narrative has been compared to the 2006 film The Prestige, without the "gripping" elements of the film.

When Jonas Åkerlund was interviewed, he said, despite the silent movie influences of it, the video was set in the present.

Synopsis and reception
Cecile (Zhang Ziyi) is a stage magician who performs magic in a traveling circus. She performs with Christophe (Chris Martin), a young magician who serves as Cecile's assistant. The duo perform various routine magic acts, such as impalement arts and shapeshifting. Cecile is married to Claude (also played by Chris Martin), a famous magician who, in addition to being an alcoholic, is violently aggressive to his wife. As Christophe continues to perform with Cecile, he starts to notice evidence of Claude's aggressive behavior towards Cecile, including bruises across her arm and witnessing Claude shouting at his wife, reducing her to tears.

Christophe, after he learns the art of levitation, formulates an idea to relieve Cecile of her troubles with Claude. He invites Cecile into the show tent to show her his newly-learnt ability to levitate himself. This however, upsets Claude who, after accusing his wife of cheating on him with Christophe, seeks to challenge him to a fight in one of his alcohol-fueled rampages. Christophe, however, uses his new abilities to levitate Claude and send him flying into the sky, thus saving Cecile from Claude. The two continue the show without Claude and show off new entertaining magic tricks and stunts.

Carl Williott of American music website Idolator wrote positively of the video, stating that it was "a quirky, entertaining video, specifically the parts with Martin playing a goofy-ass villain". Jason Scott of music blog Popdust also wrote positively, describing the music video's imagery as "vivid" and "a literal interpretation of what we've all come to expect from a 1920s side-show attraction". The video was filmed on 4 and 5 February 2014 in Los Angeles State Historic Park and no camera tricks were used.

Covers and versions
In July 2014, R&B artist Brandy released a rerecorded version of "Magic" to her TwitMusic account. The same day, it peaked at number one on Billboard''s Trending 140 chart, less than 24 hours after its premiere. Covered in live performances by various artists. In April 2014, singer Aloe Blacc performed the song on BBC Radio 1's Live Lounge. A few days later, You Me at Six covered the song BBC Radio 1's Live Lounge on the same venue. Singer Rita Ora gave a mashup rendition of "Magic" and Beyoncé's "Drunk in Love" at the Radio 1's Big Weekend event in May 2014. In September 2014, Jacob Banks also sang "Magic" on BBC Radio 1's Live Lounge. The song was also covered by singer-songwriter Lauren Aquilina for her own BBC Radio 1 Maida Vale Studios session.

Track listing

Personnel
Adapted from DR credits.

Coldplay
Guy Berryman – bass
Jonny Buckland – guitar
Will Champion – drums, percussion
Chris Martin – vocals, acoustic guitar

Additional musicians
Paul Epworth, Rick Simpson – keyboards

Technical personnel
Paul Epworth – production
Rik Simpson – production
Daniel Green – production

Charts

Weekly charts

Year-end charts

All-time charts

Certifications

Release history

References

External links

2014 singles
2014 songs
Parlophone singles
Atlantic Records singles
Coldplay songs
Song recordings produced by Paul Epworth
Song recordings produced by Rik Simpson
Songs written by Jonny Buckland
Songs written by Guy Berryman
Songs written by Will Champion
Songs written by Chris Martin
Music videos directed by Jonas Åkerlund
Black-and-white music videos